Jorge Antonio Guerrero is a Mexican actor born on August 11th 1987. He is most noted for his performance as Fermín in the 2018 film Roma, for which he was an Ariel Award nominee for Best Supporting Actor at the 61st Ariel Awards in 2019. He has also appeared in the television series Luis Miguel: The Series, Narcos: Mexico, Crime Diaries: The Candidate, Sitiados: México and Hernán, and in the film Drunken Birds (Les Oiseaux ivres). He received a Vancouver Film Critics Circle nomination for Best Actor in a Canadian Film at the Vancouver Film Critics Circle Awards 2021, and a Prix Iris nomination for Revelation of the Year at the 24th Quebec Cinema Awards in 2022, for Drunken Birds.

References

External links

1993 births
Living people
Mexican male film actors
Mexican male television actors
Male actors from Mexico City